Henri Mersch (4 October 1929 – 26 July 1983) was a Luxembourgian weightlifter. He competed in the men's heavyweight event at the 1960 Summer Olympics.

References

1929 births
1983 deaths
Luxembourgian male weightlifters
Olympic weightlifters of Luxembourg
Weightlifters at the 1960 Summer Olympics
People from Pétange